Vallon is a municipality.

Vallon may also refer to:

People with the surname
Aristide Vallon (1826—1897), French foreign legion
Harry Vallon, American gambler and mob informant
Pierre Vallon (1927-2016), French businessman and politician

Fictional characters
JoAnne Vallon, character in Alias John Law

See also

 Valon (given name)
 Vallon Man
 K. P. Vallon